System 3, System/3 or System III could refer to:

Computing and electronics
Acorn System 3, a home computer produced by Acorn Computers from 1980
Cromemco System Three, a home computer produced by Cromemco from 1978
IBM System/3, a low-end business computer manufactured between 1969 and 1985
IBM System/3X, a line of general business midrange computers manufactured from 1975
Operating System/3, operating system made by UNIVAC
System Software 3, operating system made by Apple
System 3 (software company), a software development firm
UNIX System III, operating system released by AT&T
Zenith System 3, a line of television models by Zenith Electronics

Other
 System 3 in Trilogy, album by Criss Angel and Klay Scott
 System 3 FC, a football club in St Vincent and the Grenadines
 STS-3 (Space Transportation System-3), the Space Shuttle mission

See also
 Series 3 (disambiguation)